Şehzade Mehmed Nizameddin Efendi (18 December 1908 – 19 March 1933) was an Ottoman prince, the son of Şehzade Yusuf Izzeddin and the grandson of Sultan Abdulaziz.

Biography

Şehzade Mehmed Nizameddin was born on 18 December 1908 in the Beşiktaş Palace. His father was Şehzade Yusuf Izzeddin, son of Sultan Abdulaziz and Dürrünev Kadın and his mother was Leman Hanım, a Circassian. He had two sisters, Şükriye Sultan, two years older than him and Mihrişah Sultan, seven years younger than him. He was the third child and second son of his father, and the second child of his mother.

After his father committed suicide in 1916, he and his mother and sisters resided as a guest in Dolmabahçe Palace for four months as she sought the distribution of the estate of the late prince from Sultan Mehmed V. He was educated at the princes school. By 1918 he was serving in the Ottoman army as sergeant in the unit of Infantry, a part of the second general staff.

At the exile of the imperial family in March 1924, Nizameddin and his sister Mihrişah settled in Romania. In exile, Nizameddin led an unhealthy lifestyle which made him ill, after which his mother came to stay with him for a while. On the other hand, his sister Şükriye took Mihrişah with her to Cairo, Egypt. He had begun drinking and had tuberculosis. At the doctor's recommendation, Nizameddin went to Locarno, Switzerland, for treatment in 1931. However, by this time his disease had become incurable.

Osman Fuad came to see him in Switzerland. Nizameddin died on 19 March 1933, and Osman Fuad carried his body to Cairo, Egypt, where he was buried. On 16 August 1967, he was reburied in the mausoleum of his great grandfather Sultan Mahmud II located in Divanyolu, Istanbul.

Honours

Order of the House of Osman

Military appointments

Military ranks and army appointments
 1918: Sergeant in the Infantry, Ottoman Army

Ancestry

References

Sources

1909 births
1933 deaths
20th-century Ottoman royalty
Royalty from Istanbul